Ismail Magomedovich Khalinbekov (born 3 September 1985) is a former Russian football player.

References

1985 births
Living people
Russian footballers
FC Akhmat Grozny players
Russian Premier League players
Russian expatriate footballers
Expatriate footballers in Azerbaijan
Association football defenders
FC Anzhi Makhachkala players
FC Dynamo Makhachkala players